Goodenia pilosa is a species of flowering plant in the family Goodeniaceae and is native to northern Australia and to parts of Asia. It is a prostrate to low-lying herb with erect hairs, narrow oblong to narrow elliptic leaves at the base of the plant and racemes of yellow flowers with a purplish base.

Description
Flowering occurs from May to August and the fruit is a more or less spherical capsule  in diameter.

Taxonomy and naming
This species was first formally described in 1810 by Robert Brown who gave it the name Calogyne pilosa in his Prodromus Florae Novae Hollandiae et Insulae Van Diemen. In 1990 Roger Charles Carolin changed the name to Goodenia pilosa in the journal Telopea. The specific epithet (pilosa) means "hairy".

Distribution and habitat
Goodenia pilosa usually grows in moist, sandy soil and is found in Arnhem Land and northern Queensland. It also occurs in Indonesia, China and the Philippines.

Conservation status
Goodenia pilosa is classified as of "least concern" under the Queensland Government Nature Conservation Act 1992.

References

pilosa
Flora of the Northern Territory
Flora of Queensland
Flora of Indonesia
Flora of China
Flora of the Philippines
Plants described in 1810
Taxa named by Robert Brown (botanist, born 1773)